Asdang Dejavudh, Prince of Nakhon Ratchasima (12 May 1889 – 9 February 1924) was a son of King Chulalongkorn and Queen Saovabha Phongsri of Thailand.

Biography 
Prince Asdang Dejavudh was born on 12 May 1889 is a son of King Chulalongkorn and  Queen Saovabha Phongsri. He was given nickname as Eiad-lek or Prince Eiad-lek and best known in the palace by his nickname of "Thunkramom Eiad-lek".

Royal Decorations
  The Most Illustrious Order of the Royal House of Chakri
  The Ancient and Auspicious of Order of the Nine Gems
  Dame Grand Cross (First Class) of The Most Illustrious Order of Chula Chom Klao
  Ratana Varabhorn Order of Merit
  Dame Grand Cordon (Special Class) of The Most Noble Order of the Crown of Thailand
  King Rama IV Royal Cypher Medal (Second Class)
  King Rama V Royal Cypher Medal (First Class)
  King Rama VI Royal Cypher Medal (First Class)

Ancestry

1889 births
1924 deaths
19th-century Thai people
Thai male Chao Fa
Knights Grand Cordon of the Order of Chula Chom Klao
Knights of the Ratana Varabhorn Order of Merit
Children of Chulalongkorn
Royal Thai Navy personnel
Thai admirals
Sons of kings
Non-inheriting heirs presumptive